Élodie Poublan (born 13 April 1989 in Pau) is a rugby union player. She represented  at the 2010 Women's Rugby World Cup and was named in the squad to the 2014 Women's Rugby World Cup. She plays for Montpellier HRC.

References

1989 births
Living people
Sportspeople from Pau, Pyrénées-Atlantiques
French female rugby union players